Pointe-à-Pierre is a parliamentary electoral district in Trinidad and Tobago on the south-west coast of Trinidad. David Lee of the United National Congress was elected its Member of Parliament in the 2015 and 2020 Trinidad and Tobago general elections.

Constituency profile 
The constituency was created prior to the 1956 general election. It had an electorate of 23,504 as of 2015. It includes Claxton Bay, Marabella, Tarouba, Pointe-à-Pierre and portions of Vistabella. It is considered a marginal seat.

Members of Parliament 
This constituency has elected the following members of the House of Representatives of Trinidad and Tobago:

Election results

Elections in the 2020s

Elections in the 2010s

References 

Constituencies of the Parliament of Trinidad and Tobago